The Wilkinson-Boineau House is a significant example of an early 19th-century Greek Revival residence with minor 20th-century alterations. William Wilkinson, a planter, established a village, Wilkinsonville, about 1830 that bears his name, and the house was the first one built. He lived for most of the year at his plantation on Swinton Creek.

Milton Carroll Boineau acquired the property in the 1920s. In the 1930s, the family built a one-story addition on the back and removed part of the central hall. The house is on tall brick piers. The original part was a two-story central hall house. A hip-roofed porch along the entire front is accessed by a brick staircase. The house has square edge weatherboarding and a tall lateral gable roof. The original windows were nine-over-nine double-hung sashes, but two-over-two double-hung sashes were used to replace them in the 1930s or 1940s. The roof is corrugated metal.

The house was added to the National Register of Historic Places  January 21, 1999.

References

National Register of Historic Places in Charleston County, South Carolina
Houses in Charleston County, South Carolina
Houses on the National Register of Historic Places in South Carolina